Bythinella cylindrica is a species of very small freshwater snail, an aquatic gastropod mollusk in the family Amnicolidae. This species is endemic to Austria.

References

Bythinella
Endemic fauna of Austria
Gastropods described in 1856
Taxonomy articles created by Polbot
Taxa named by Georg Ritter von Frauenfeld